The Three Brothers  is a 1995 French comedy film written, directed by and starring Didier Bourdon and Bernard Campan alongside their Les Inconnus partner Pascal Légitimus.

The film won the award for Best Debut at the César Awards in 1996.

Plot
Three brothers meet each other for the first time after their mother's death. Believing that they will inherit her fortune, they quickly spend their money. However, when the inheritance does not transpire, the brothers become closer as they try to work out what to do.

Casting 

 Didier Bourdon : Didier Latour
 Bernard Campan : Bernard Latour
 Pascal Légitimus : Pascal Latour
 Antoine du Merle : Michael Rossignol
 Anne Jacquemin : Marie
 Marine Jolivet : Christine Rossignol
 Annick Alane : Geneviève Rougemont
 Pierre Meyrand : Charles-Henri Rougemont
 Isabelle Gruault : Marie-Ange Rougemont
 Marie-Christine Adam : Sandra 
 Bernard Farcy : Monsieur Steven
 Élie Semoun : Brice
 Henri Courseaux  : Mᵉ Larieux
 Jean-François Pastout : Mᵉ Gonzales
 Yolande Moreau & Bruno Lochet : PMU's owners
 Jacky Nercessian : le présentateur du Millionnaire
 Pascal N'Zonzi : The recruiter
 Chick Ortega : le chef cuisinier

References

External links
 
 

1995 films
French comedy films
Best First Feature Film César Award winners
Films produced by Claude Berri
1995 comedy films
1990s French-language films
1990s French films
Films shot in Alsace